Kelly Barnhill may refer to: 
Kelly Barnhill (author) (born 1973), American author of children's literature, fantasy and science fiction
Kelly Barnhill (softball) (born 1997), American softball pitcher